Hyperactivity has long been part of the human condition, although hyperactive behaviour has not always been seen as problematic.

The terminology used to describe the symptoms of attention deficit hyperactivity disorder, or ADHD, has gone through many changes over history, including "minimal brain damage", "minimal brain dysfunction", "learning/behavioral disabilities" and "hyperactivity".  In the second edition of the Diagnostic and Statistical Manual of Mental Disorders, known as DSM-II (1968), the condition was called "Hyperkinetic Reaction of Childhood".  It was in the 1980 DSM-III that "ADD (Attention-Deficit Disorder) with or without hyperactivity" was introduced. In 1987 this label was further refined to "ADHD (Attention-deficit Hyperactivity Disorder)" in the DSM-III-R and subsequent editions, including the current DSM-5.

18th century
A number of early writers described human behaviour patterns similar to today's definitions of ADHD.

Melchior Adam Weikard
In 1775, Melchior Adam Weikard, a prominent German physician, published the textbook Der Philosophische Arzt.  Weikard's text contained a description of ADHD-like behaviours, possibly the first ever such description in medical literature Weikard described many of the symptoms now associated with the inattentive dimension of ADHD in the Diagnostic and Statistical Manual of Mental Disorders.  For instance, according to the English translation provided by Barkley and Peters, Weikard stated that:

An inattentive person won't remark anything but will be shallow everywhere. He studies his matters only superficially; his judgements are erroneous and he misconceives the worth of things because he does not spend enough time and patience to search a matter individually or by the piece with the adequate accuracy.  Such people only hear half of everything; they memorize or inform only half of it or do it in a messy manner. According to a proverb they generally know a little bit of all and nothing of the whole…. They are mostly reckless, often copious considering imprudent projects, but they are also most inconstant in execution. They treat everything in a light manner since they are not attentive enough to feel denigration or disadvantages.

According to Weikard, the treatment recommended was:
The inattentive person is to be separated from the noise or any other objects; he is to be kept solitary, in the dark, when he is too active. The easily agile fibres are to be fixated by rubbing, cold baths, steel powder, cinchona, mineral waters, horseback riding, and gymnastic exercises.

Sir Alexander Crichton
Scottish-born physician and author, Sir Alexander Crichton described, in 1798, a mental state much like the inattentive subtype of ADHD, in his book An Inquiry into the Nature and Origin of Mental Derangement.  Crichton had received some of his medical training in Germany and may well have known Weikard given that his training occurred in several of the towns where Weikard was known to have practiced medicine. More detailed in his observation than Weikard, Crichton described attention problems as:

The incapacity of attending with a necessary degree of constancy to any one object, almost always arises from an unnatural or morbid sensibility of the nerves, by which means this faculty is incessantly withdrawn from one impression to another. It may be either born with a person, or it may be the effect of accidental diseases.

When born with a person it becomes evident at a very early period of life, and has a very bad effect, inasmuch as it renders him incapable of attending with constancy to any one object of education. But it seldom is in so great a degree as totally to impede all instruction; and what is very fortunate, it is generally diminished with age.

Crichton further observed:
In this disease of attention, if it can with propriety be called so, every impression seems to agitate the person, and gives him or her an unnatural degree of mental restlessness. People walking up and down the room, a slight noise in the same, the moving of a table, the shutting a door suddenly, a slight excess of heat or of cold, too much light, or too little light, all destroy constant attention in such patients, inasmuch as it is easily excited by every impression.

Crichton noted that "…they have a particular name for the state of their nerves, which is expressive enough of their feelings. They say they have the fidgets." Dr. Crichton suggested that these children needed special educational intervention and noted that it was obvious that they had a problem attending even how hard they did try.  "Every public teacher must have observed that there are many to whom the dryness and difficulties of the Latin and Greek grammars are so disgusting that neither the terrors of the rod, nor the indulgence of kind intreaty can cause them to give their attention to them."

Both Melchior Adam Weikard and Alexander Crichton wrote about the occupationally disabling features of this disorder, including attentional problems, restlessness, early onset, and how it can affect schooling, without any of the moralism introduced by George Still and later authors.

20th century

Sir George Frederic Still
In March 1902, Sir George Frederic Still (1868–1941), known as the father of British paediatrics, gave a series of lectures to the Royal College of Physicians in London under the name Goulstonian Lectures on ‘some abnormal psychical conditions in children’, which were published later the same year in The Lancet.

He described 43 children who had serious problems with sustained attention and self-regulation, who were often aggressive, defiant, resistant to discipline, excessively emotional or passionate, which showed little inhibitory volition, and could not learn from the consequences of their actions; though their intellect was normal. He wrote: "I would point out that a notable feature in many of these cases of moral defect without general impairment of intellect is a quite abnormal incapacity for sustained attention.

Dr. Still wrote:  "there is a defect of moral consciousness which cannot be accounted for by any fault of environment". When Still was talking about moral control, he was referring to it as William James had done before him, but to Still, the moral control of behavior meant "the control of action in conformity with the idea of the good of all."

"Another boy, aged 6 years, with marked moral defect was unable to keep his attention even to a game for more than a very short time, and as might be expected, the failure of attention was very noticeable at school, with the result that in some cases the child was backward in school attainments, although in manner and ordinary conversation he appeared as bright and intelligent as any child could be." He proposed a biological predisposition to this behavioral condition that was probably hereditary in some children and the result of pre- or postnatal injury in others.

Many historians of ADHD have inferred that the children Still described in his series of three published lectures to the Royal College of Physicians would likely have qualified for the current disorder of ADHD combined type, among other disorders.

Encephalitis epidemic 1917–1918
The treatment of children with similar behavioral problems who had survived the epidemic of encephalitis lethargica from 1917 to  1918 and the pandemic of influenza from 1919 to 1920 led to terminology which referred to "brain damage." This would also be called "post-encephalitic behavior disorder."  The association of symptoms similar to ADHD in the surviving children eventually led later authors to speculate that whenever the behavior pattern may be present, it may reflect an underlying disturbance of or damage to the brain.  The syndrome came to be known as brain-injured child syndrome, to be amended later to minimal brain damage, and subsequently to minimal brain dysfunction.

Diagnostic and Statistical Manual of Mental Disorders (DSM) terminology

The clinical definition of "ADHD" dates to the mid-20th century, but was known by other names. Physicians developed a diagnosis for a set of conditions variously referred to as "minimal brain damage", "minimal brain dysfunction", "minimal brain disorder", "learning/behavioral disabilities" and "hyperactivity". Some of these labels became problematic as knowledge expanded. For example, as awareness grew that many children with no indication of brain damage also displayed the syndrome, the label which included the words "brain damage" did not seem appropriate.

The DSM-II (1968) began to call it "Hyperkinetic Reaction of Childhood" even though the professionals were aware that many of the children so diagnosed exhibited attention deficits without any signs of hyperactivity. In 1980, the DSM-III introduced the term "ADD (Attention-Deficit Disorder) with or without hyperactivity." That terminology (ADD) technically expired with the revision in 1987 to ADHD in the DSM-III-R. In the DSM-IV, published in 1994, ADHD with sub-types was presented. The DSM-IV-TR was released in 2000, primarily to correct factual errors and make changes to reflect recent research; ADHD was largely unchanged.

Under the DSM-5, there are three ADHD presentations, including one which lacks the hyperactivity component. Approximately one-third of people with ADHD have the predominantly inattentive presentation (ADHD-I), meaning that they do not have the hyperactive or overactive behavior components of the other ADHD presentations.

Even today, the ADHD terminology is objectionable to many. There is some preference for using the ADHD-I, ADD, and AADD terminology when describing individuals lacking the hyperactivity component, especially among older adolescents and adults who find the term "hyperactive" inaccurate, inappropriate and even derogatory.

Adult ADHD diagnostic expansion
In the 1970s, American research began to study the symptoms and development of children diagnosed with ADHD. By the 1980s, research was published confirming the continuation of ADHD symptoms beyond childhood. Some controversy exists over the findings of scholars such as Gabrielle Weiss in 1986, which showed a 66% continuation of symptoms into adulthood, contrasted with a lower 31% reported by Gittleman et al. Research continued from there, often based on the model that ADHD could only be continued and not recognized and diagnosed newly in adults and adolescents. Publications by numerous individuals, including Kelly and Ramundo as well as Hallowell and Ratey in the 1990s, complicated this model by not only inspiring self-diagnosis but also through promoting the social model of disability. Currently there exists significant social and medical debate surrounding medication and prevailing diagnosis of ADHD in adults as well as children. Partly, this is influenced by media and agenda setting. As analyzed by Conrad and Potter, "ironically, controversy about ADHD raises the public's awareness and increases the diffusion of information about the disorder, which can indirectly contribute to diagnostic expansion."

References

External links
 Attention deficit-hyperactivity disorder: An illustrated historical overview

Attention deficit hyperactivity disorder
Attention d

de:Aufmerksamkeitsdefizit-/Hyperaktivitätsstörung#Geschichte
fr:Trouble du déficit de l'attention avec ou sans hyperactivité#Historique et classifications
it:Sindrome da deficit di attenzione e iperattività#Cenni storici
nl:ADHD#Geschiedenis